Gustav Adolph Kenngott (January 6, 1818 – March 7, 1897) was a German mineralogist.

Biography
Kenngott was born in Breslau. After being employed in the Hofmineralien-Cabinett at
Vienna. From 1857 to 1893 he was also full professor of mineralogy at the ETH Zurich and at the University of Zürich. He was distinguished for his researches on mineralogy, crystallography and petrology. In 1855, from the serpentine of Mount Zdjar near Schönberg in Moravia, Kenngott was the first to describe enstatite. In 1860 he identified a new mineral, giving it the name pisanite in honor of Felice Pisani. Kenngott died in Lugano.

Publications
Lehrbuch der reinen Krystallographie (1846) – Textbook of pure crystallography.
Lehrbuch der Mineralogie (1852 and 1857; 5th ed., 1880) – Textbook of mineralogy.
Übersicht der Resultate mineralogischer Forschungen in den Jahren 1844-1865 (7 vols., 1852-1868) – Overview of the results of mineralogical research in the years 1844–65.
Die Minerale der Schweiz (1866) – The minerals of Switzerland.
Elemente der Petrographie (1868) – Elements of petrography.

Notes

References

External links
 :de:Gustav Adolf Kenngott
 :it:Pisanite

1818 births
1897 deaths
German mineralogists
Scientists from Wrocław
Academic staff of the University of Zurich
Corresponding members of the Saint Petersburg Academy of Sciences
Academic staff of ETH Zurich